The 1972–73 FA Cup was the 92nd season of the world's oldest football cup competition, the Football Association Challenge Cup, commonly known as the FA Cup. Second Division Sunderland won the competition for the second time, beating holders Leeds United 1–0 in the final at Wembley, London with a goal from Ian Porterfield.

Matches were scheduled to be played at the stadium of the team named first on the date specified for each round, which was always a Saturday. Some matches, however, might be rescheduled for other days if there were clashes with games for other competitions or the weather was inclement. If scores were level after 90 minutes had been played, a replay would take place at the stadium of the second-named team later the same week. If the replayed match was drawn further replays would be held until a winner was determined. If scores were level after 90 minutes had been played in a replay, a 30-minute period of extra time would be played.

Calendar

Results

First Round Proper

At this stage clubs from the Football League Third and Fourth Divisions joined 28 non-league clubs having come through the qualifying rounds. To complete this round, Stafford Rangers, Barnet, Hendon and Enfield were given byes as finalists of FA Trophy and FA Amateur Cup the last season. Matches were scheduled to be played on Saturday, 18 November 1972. Nine matches were drawn, of which one went to a second replay.

Second Round Proper
The matches were scheduled for Saturday, 9 December 1972, with the exception of the Walsall–Charlton Athletic game which was played three days later. Five matches were drawn, with replays taking place later the same week.

Third Round Proper
The 44 First and Second Division clubs entered the competition at this stage. The matches were scheduled Saturday, 13 January 1973, with the exception of the Reading–Doncaster Rovers game, which was played on the following Wednesday. Eleven matches were drawn, of which two required a second replay.

The first attempted replay between Nottingham Forest and West Bromwich Albion was abandoned in the 81st minute with the score at 1–1 due to fog at the City Ground.  It was successfully re-staged six days later but was drawn 0–0, necessitating a second replay.

Fourth Round Proper
The matches were scheduled for Saturday, 3 February 1973. Five matches were drawn, of which two required a second replay.

Fifth Round Proper
The matches were scheduled for Saturday, 24 February 1973 with one replay played three days later.

Sixth Round Proper

The four quarter-final ties were played on the 17 March 1973. There was one replay three days later.

Semi-finals

The semi-final matches were played on Saturday, 7 April 1973 with no replays being needed. Sunderland and Leeds United won their respective matches to go on to the final at Wembley.

Third place playoff
Between 1970 and 1974, a third place playoff between the two losing semi-finalists was held.

Final

The final took place on Saturday, 5 May 1973 at Wembley and ended in a victory for Sunderland over Leeds United by one goal to nil. The attendance was 100,000.

References
General
The FA Cup Archive at TheFA.com
English FA Cup 1972–73 at Soccerbase
FA Cup results 1972–73 at Footballsite
Specific

 
FA Cup seasons
Fa
Eng